Bela Reka is a village in Šabac, Serbia.

Archeological findings dating to 1st and 2nd century AD Roman Serbia of a villa rustica, high quality golden and silver jewelry and other vessels and 322 coins.

References

Roman sites in Serbia
Mačva District